Archibald Kennedy IV, Earl of Cassilis,  (4 June 1794 – 12 August 1832) was the eldest son of Archibald Kennedy, 1st Marquess of Ailsa. He was styled Lord Kennedy until 1831, and Earl of Cassilis thereafter until his death.

He studied at the University of Saint Andrew under the tutorage of James Ferrie, Professor of Civil History.

He married Eleanor Allardyce on 1 May 1814, and had one daughter and nine sons. They were:

Hannah Eleanor (April 1815 – 8 May 1877),
Lord Archibald (25 Aug. 1816 – 20 March 1870),
Alexander (Apr. 1818 – Oct. 1832)
John (September 1819 – 3 September 1846)
Lord David (17 November 1820 – 10 April 1905), who married Lady Mary Emily Boyle, daughter of Charles Boyle, 13th Viscount Dungarvan (6 December 1800 – 25 August 1834) and Lady Catherine St Lawrence, daughter of William St Lawrence, 2nd Earl of Howth. They had one daughter, Evelyn Mary
Lord Gilbert (14 July 1822 – 25 Nov. 1901), married his cousin Margaret Baird, daughter of Sir David Baird, 2nd Baronet and Lady Anne Kennedy (daughter of Archibald Kennedy, 1st Marquess of Ailsa. They had two sons, and two daughters.
Capt. Lord William (30 November 1823 – 5 March 1868), who married Sarah Jane de Blois and had three children.
Lord Nigel (May 1828-18 March 1878), married twice. Firstly Catherine May, and secondly Elizabeth Charlotte Neeld, with whom he had three children.
Lord Adolphus Archibald (12 July 1832 – 20 June 1842)

References

External links 

1794 births
1832 deaths
Courtesy earls
Heirs apparent who never acceded
Knights of the Thistle
Kennedy, Archibald Kennedy, Lord
Kennedy, Archibald Kennedy, Lord
Archibald
English people of Dutch descent
Schuyler family
Van Cortlandt family